James Bain (1878 – unknown) was a Scottish footballer. His regular position was as a forward. He was born in Dundee. He played for Dundee and Manchester United.

External links
MUFCInfo.com profile

1878 births
Scottish footballers
Manchester United F.C. players
Dundee F.C. players
Year of death missing
Footballers from Dundee
Association football forwards